Väinö Heikkilä (25 April 1888 – 5 May 1943) was a Finnish athlete. He competed in the men's individual cross country event at the 1912 Summer Olympics.

References

External links
 

1888 births
1943 deaths
Athletes (track and field) at the 1912 Summer Olympics
Finnish male long-distance runners
Olympic athletes of Finland
People from Lieto
Olympic cross country runners
Sportspeople from Southwest Finland